Alkistis Christina Benekou (born 31 January 1994) is a water polo player from Greece.

She played on the Greece Junior National Team which won gold at the 2011 LEN Junior Water Polo European Championship, and was part of the Greek team at the 2013 World Aquatics Championships. 

In 2014, she joined Arizona State University and began playing for their Sun Devils water polo team as a centre forward. In early 2017, she became one of the top ten scorers in the team's history.

Benekou is currently playing for Ethnikos Piraeus.

Titles

With Olympiacos 

 1 LEN Euroleague Women: 2021
 1 Greek Women's Water Polo Championship: 2021
 1 Greek Women's Water Polo Cup: 2021

With Ethnikos 

 1 LEN Trophy: 2022

See also
 Greece at the 2013 World Aquatics Championships

References

Greek female water polo players
Olympiacos Women's Water Polo Team players
Living people
Place of birth missing (living people)
1994 births

Ethnikos Piraeus Water Polo Club players
21st-century Greek women